Round Pond may refer to:

Ponds or places
in Canada
 Round Pond (Newfoundland), near Bay d'Espoir, Newfoundland and Labrador

in England
 Round Pond (London) in Kensington Gardens

in the United States
 Round Pond (Connecticut)
 Round Pond (Berlin, New York)
 Round Pond (Limekiln Lake, New York)
 Round Pond (Old Forge, New York)
 Round Pond (Tewksbury, Massachusetts)
 Round Pond in Round Pond Recreation Area, near the United States Military Academy in New York State
 Round Pond now called Culver's Lake in Frankford Township, New Jersey

Other
Round Pond (horse), a thoroughbred racehorse